Articles (arranged alphabetically) related to Gabon include:



A
Abanayop -
Jean-Baptiste Abessolo -
Jean-Jérôme Adam -
Adouma -
Adyumba -
Adzap -
Jean-Marie Adzé - 
Affaires africaines -
AfricaPhonebook/Annuaires Afrique -
Pierre-Louis Agondjo-Okawe -
Pierre Akendengué -
Alar Ayong -
Martin Alihanga -
Francis Allison -
Joseph Ambouroue-Avaro -
Eugene Amogho -
Andre-Ferdinand Anguile -
André Gustave Anguilé -
Laurent Antchouey -
Sister Hyacinthe Antini -
Apindji -
Art of Gabon -
Jean-Boniface Assélé -
Association Générale des Étudiants du Gabon -
Jean-Hilaire Aubame -
Pierre Avaro -
Awandji -
Jean Rémy Ayouné

B
Babuissi -
Bakele -
Bapounou (Pounou) -
Batsangui (Tsangui) -
Benga -
Jean-Rémy Bessieux -
Laurent-Marie Biffot -
Louis Bigmann -
Bloc Democratique Gabonais -
Ali Bongo Ondimba -
Martin Bongo -
Omar Bongo -
Pascaline Bongo -
Jean-Jacques Boucavel -
Edouard Bouet-Williamez -
Augustin Boumah -
Jules Bourdes-Ogouliguende -
Pierre Savorgnan de Brazza -
Brothers of Saint Gabriel -
Buengui River -
Albert Bushnell -
Buzogo River - 
Bwiti

C
Caisse Centrale de Coopération Économique (CCCE) -
Catholicism in Gabon -
Centre International des Civilisations Bantu (CICIBA) -
Chamber of Commerce, Agriculture, Industry and Mines -
Chiwa (Bichiwa) -
Cinema of Gabon -
Comité Mixte Gabonais (CMG) -
Comité Mpongwe -
Constitution of Gabon -
Coup of February 17–20, 1964 -
Currency of Gabon -

D
Georges Aleka Damas -
Gabriel d'Arboussier -
Charles Francis Darlington -
Pierre Debizet -
Decolonization in Gabon -
Maurice Delauney -
Demographics of Gabon -
King Denis (Antchouwe Kowe Rapontchombo) -
Ndouna Depenaud -
Divungi Dijob Di NDing-
Divounguy Pierre Claver-
Josiah Dorsey -
Paul du Chaillu -
Luc Durand-Reville

E
Félix Éboué -
Ecole Montfort -
Economy of Gabon -
Education in Gabon -
Jean-Marc Ekoh -
Emane Tole -
Enenga -
Eshira -
Eveia -
Exploration of Gabon -
Eyi Affair

F
Fang -
Brother Dominique Fara -
Felix-Anande Rapontchombo -
Denis-Marie Adande -
Fernan Vaz Lagoon -
FIDES -
Henry A. Ford -
Foreign relations of Gabon -
Forestry in Gabon -
Franc zone -
Franceville -
Free Emigrants Scheme -
Free French -
Freedom Villages -
French Equatorial Africa

G
Galoa (Galwa) -
Émile Gentil -
King Glass (R'Ogouarowe) -
Gold in Gabon -
Paul Indjenjet Gondjout -
Groupes d'Etudes Communistes (GEC) -

H
History of Gabon -
Holy Ghost Father (Spiritans)

I
J. Ikenga Ibea -
Immaculate Conception Sisters (Blue Sisters) -
Indigénat -
Iron in Gabon -
Islam in Gabon -
Aristide Issembe -
Emile Issembe -
iboga

J
Benjamin Van Rensselaer James -
Jeunes Gabonais (Jeunesse Gabonais)

K
Kanigui (Akanigui, Bakanike) -
Theophile Klaine-
Kassa Mapessi

L
Labor unions in Gabon -
Languages of Gabon -
Richard E. Lawlin -
Pierre-Marie Le Berre -
Captain Le Cour -
Alexandre Le Roy -
LGBT rights in Gabon (Gay rights) -
Libreville -
Ligue des droits de l'homme -
Loango -
Blaise Louembe - 
King Louis (Anguile Dowe) -
Louis Berre Monguitigana -
Loumbou (Baloumbou) -

M
Mademoiselle (movement) -
Raphael Mangouala - 
Pierre Claver Maganga Moussavou -
Mahongwe -
Felicien-Patrice Makouaka -
Sébastien Mamboundou Mouyama -
Manganese in Gabon -
Herve Mapako-Gnali -
Massango (Sangou) -
Germain Mba -
Léon M'ba -
Paul Mba-Abessole -
Emanuel Mba-Zue -
Léon Mébiame -
Media in Gabon -
Roger Mengue Mi Ekomie -
Nicolas Metegue N'nah -
Métis -
François Meye -
Jean-Stanislas Migolet -
Military of Gabon -
Mitsogo (Mitshogo, Tshogo) -
Stephanie Mouwandji Itsopault - 
Mouvement de Redressement National (MORENA) -
Mpongwe people -
Music of Gabon -
Mutuelle Gabonaise -
Basile Engone Mve -
Charles Mve Ellah

N
Samuel Adrien Nang Essono -
Robert Hamill Nassau -
National Archives of Gabon -
Jean-Baptiste N'Dende -
Ndiwa -
Nding Dyatelm-
François Ndong -
Mendame Ndong -
Philippe Tsira Ndong Ntoutoume -
Ndoumou (Mindoumou) -
Ngowe (Ngove) -
François Owono Nguema -
Patrick N'Guema N'Dong -
Nkomi -
Truman Ntaka -
Charles N'Tchoréré -
Jean-François Ntoutoume Emane -
Vincent de Paul Nyonda -
Nzabi (Bandiabi)

O
Obamba (Mbamba) -
Cyriaque Simeon Obamba -
Ogooué River -
Ogoula-M'Beye -
King Ogoul' Issogoue (Rogombe, Passol) -
Oil and gas in Gabon -
Okande -
Oklo reactor site -
Okoume -
Ombambo-Rogombe -
ORSTOM -
Orungu -
Laurent Owondo -
Casimir Oyé-Mba

P
Louis-Gabriel Pambo - 
Parti Démocratique Africain (PDA) -
Parti Démocratique Gabonais (PDG) -
Parti d'Union Nationale Gabonais (PUNGA) -
Parti gabonais du progrès (PGP) -
Peoples of Gabon -
Petroleum in Gabon -
Politics of Gabon -
Port-Gentil -
Paul-Vincent Pounah -
Pove (Pubi) -
Prehistory of Gabon -
Ira Preston -
Professors' Plot -
Protestantism in Gabon -
Pygmies -

Q
King Quaben (Kaka-Rapono)

R
Jean-Félix Rapontchombo -
Angele Ntyugwetondo Rawiri -
George Rawiri -
Remi Rebombe -
Joseph Rendjambe -
King Reombi-Mpolo -
Maurice Robert -
Rubber in Gabon -

S
Louis Sanmarco -
Albert Schweitzer -
Henri Seignon -
Seke -
Shake -
Shimba (Simba) -
Slave trade -
Société Commerciale, Industrielle, et Africole du Haut-Ogooue -
Société Nationale Petrolière Gabonaise -
René-Paul Sousatte -
Survivor: Gabon - Simone Saint-Dénis

T
Jean-Felix Tchicaya -
Teke people (Bateke) -
Toko Ravony -
Patrice Tonda -
Transportation in Gabon -
Henri Trilles -
Ntaka Truman

U
Union Démocratique et Sociale Gabonaise (UDSG) -
Union Douanière et Économique de l'Afrique Centrale (UDEAC) -
Uranium in Gabon

V
François-de-Paul Vane -
Varama -
Vili people -
La Voix du Pays -
Voungou

W
Andre Raponda Walker -
William Walker -
Henri Walker-Deemin -
John Leighton Wilson -
Woumbou (Bavumbu)

Y
Paul-Marie Yembit

Z

 
Gabon